Greenville Memorial Auditorium was a 7,500-seat multi-purpose arena built in 1958 that was located in Greenville, South Carolina. It hosted local sporting events, concerts and the Ringling Brothers Circus until the Bi-Lo Center opened in 1998.

It hosted professional wrestling throughout its history, especially in the 1970s and 1980s, with NWA Jim Crockett Promotions cards held every Monday night.

It hosted the Southern Conference men's basketball tournaments in 1972, 1975, and 1976.

Lynyrd Skynyrd performed there on October 19, 1977, the last concert played by the original band prior to its fatal plane crash that took most of its members the next day en route to Baton Rouge, Louisiana.

The arena was imploded on September 20, 1997.

References

Defunct college basketball venues in the United States 
Indoor arenas in South Carolina
Furman Paladins men's basketball
Monuments and memorials in South Carolina
Sports venues completed in 1958
Sports venues demolished in 1997
Sports venues in Greenville, South Carolina
Demolished sports venues in the United States
1958 establishments in South Carolina
1997 disestablishments in South Carolina
Buildings and structures demolished by controlled implosion